Zoya Ivanova (Зоя Иванова; born March 14, 1952, in Petropavl, Kazakh SSR) is a retired long-distance runner from Kazakhstan, who represented the Soviet Union in the women's marathon at the 1988 Summer Olympics in Seoul, South Korea.

She was the 1982 winner of the Tokyo International Women's Marathon. Ivanova was runner-up 1987 World Championships, taking the marathon silver medal.

Competitions

External links
 Year Rankings
 

1952 births
Living people
People from Petropavl
Soviet female long-distance runners
Soviet female marathon runners
Kazakhstani female long-distance runners
Kazakhstani female marathon runners
Olympic athletes of the Soviet Union
Athletes (track and field) at the 1988 Summer Olympics
Goodwill Games medalists in athletics
World Athletics Championships athletes for the Soviet Union
World Athletics Championships medalists
Tokyo Marathon female winners
Competitors at the 1990 Goodwill Games
Friendship Games medalists in athletics
Kazakhstani people of Russian descent